The Ironbound is a neighborhood in the city of Newark in Essex County, New Jersey, United States. Historically, the area was called "Dutch Neck," "Down Neck," or simply "the Neck," due to the appearance of the curve of the Passaic River. The Ironbound is part of Newark's East Ward and is directly east of Newark Penn Station and Downtown Newark, and south and west of the river, over which passes the Jackson Street Bridge, connecting to Harrison and Kearny. The area became a major transmission "hotspot" of the COVID-19 pandemic in late 2020.

Early history
The name "The Ironbound" is said to derive from the large metalworking industry in the area or from the network of railroad tracks that surrounded the neighborhood. The Ironbound was mostly farmland until the 1830s, when industry and immigration began increasing at a rapid pace.

Industry 
The Ironbound was an industrial neighborhood in the 19th and early 20th centuries. The neighborhood was home to Hensler's Beer Brewery, P. Ballantine and Sons Brewing Company (in 1954 Newark's largest employer) and the Feigenspan Brewery. Balbach Smelting & Refining Company, now the location of Riverbank Park, was the second largest metal processing enterprise in the United States until its closure in the 1920s. Other large industrial buildings included Murphy Varnish Works,.

Immigration 
The Ironbound has experienced several waves of immigration. The first wave, starting in the 1830s, came from the German states. Wrote historian Charles Cummings, "Overnight, whole sections of the Ironbound became Irish and German". Polish and Italian immigrants arrived in the latter half of the 19th century, followed by Portuguese and Spanish starting in the 1910s.  By 1921 there was a large enough Portuguese population to found Sport Club Portuguese, the first of over twenty Portuguese social clubs that would call the Ironbound home.

Historical landmarks 
The following sites in the Ironbound are on the National Register of Historic Places:

 Murphy Varnish Works
 Pennsylvania Station (Newark)
 Riverbank Park
 St. Casimir's Roman Catholic Church (Newark, New Jersey)
 St. Stephan's Church (Ironbound, Newark, New Jersey)

Culture and festivals
In 2017, the New York Times described the neighborhood as:Four square miles populated in large part by Portuguese, Spanish and Latin American immigrants and their descendants, the Ironbound has the intimacy and hustle of a European market town. “We walk to the bakery, the fishmonger, the wine store,” said [the director of the Newark Museum]. (He also walks to work.) “It really is an extraordinarily agreeable lifestyle.”

Portuguese community
Today, the Ironbound is known for being a Portuguese neighborhood. TAP Air Portugal has its corporate office in the neighborhood. Ironbound Volunteer Ambulance Squad has been serving the community since 1952. Ironbound also has its own newspaper. Many Portuguese still live in Ironbound, but many are moving out to other neighborhoods in New Jersey, Including South River, Livingston, Clark, Westfield, Watchung, Old Bridge, etc.

A small sitting park east of Penn Station is named in honor of Peter Francisco, a Portuguese-born patriot of the American War of Independence. An obelisk in Francisco's memory was raised in the park by the Portuguese community in 1976. Peter Francisco Park also features a memorial to Portuguese-American war veterans dedicated in 2018 as well as the Ironbound Immigrants Memorial, dedicated in 2019.

Portugal Day festival
Every year, people flock to the annual Portuguese Parade & Festival, known as Portugal Day, "Dia de Portugal" (typically held the first or second weekend in June), an enormous celebration of Portuguese culture.

During Portugal Day Weekend, many people come out to celebrate Portuguese-American culture.  Ferry Street is also the location for most soccer fans to come and celebrate.  Fans walk up and down the street while others decorate their cars and celebrate the victory of their soccer team..

Ecuadorian Day festival 
Typically held in the first or second weekend of August, the Ecuadorian Day Parade & festival take place in Ferry Street. In this event various businesses and politicians attend the parade and support the Ecuadorian culture in a statewide recognized festivity.

Brazilian Day festival 
Typically held in the first or second weekend of September, the Brazilian day festival takes place also in Ferry Street. Various street vendors, musical concerts, and restaurants show support for Brazilian culture.

Demographics

The Ironbound used to mainly consist of Italians, Polish, Portuguese, and Spaniard Immigrants. As time went on many Italian, and Polish immigrants have moved out of the Ironbound. However there are still significant numbers of residents of Italian and Polish descent residing in the Ironbound. Recent immigrants include large numbers of Brazilians and Ecuadorians. 2000s census demographics include;

57.46% White/Caucasian/European (Mainly consisting of Italian, Spanish, Polish, and other European Ethnicity)

34.94% Hispanic & Latino (Mainly consisting of Brazilians, Ecuadorians, Etc.)

0.95% Asian/American Indian

4.68% Black/African American

1.97% Muiti-Racial

Parks and recreation

Independence Park
This park is in the Ironbound district.  Our Lady of Mt. Carmel, the Ironbound's first Italian parish, faces the park. The church holds an annual Italian Festival which attracts Italian-American people that live in the neighborhood, and Italians who moved out of the Ironbound.

Riverfront Park and waterfront

A chain of parkland along the Passaic River, especially along the downward "curve" in the river that gave the Ironbound neighborhood its nickname of "Down Neck," offers waterfront recreation in the city. Kayaking and riverboat tours of the city are offered in the summer months. From east to west along the downward "neck" of the Passaic, parkland includes:
Riverfront Park, which  stretches along the Passaic River offering the "Orange Boardwalk" walkway paths with views of the water. Red Bull Arena may be seen looking north across the river to the Harrison bank.
Riverbank Park in the Ironbound along the Passaic River.
Peter Francisco Park is a small park near Penn Station in honor of the Portuguese-born Revolution-era patriot.

Education

Public schools
The Newark Public Schools operates six elementary and K-8 schools in the area. Schools serving Ironbound include Wilson Avenue School, Hawkins Street School, Lafayette Street School and Oliver Street School. In addition is Ann Street School, which is considered by many to be one of the best elementary schools in the city and the K-5 South Street School.  In fact, Ann Street School received the Blue Ribbon School of Excellence from the US Department of Education.  This competitive award had not been awarded to a Newark Public School before.  In addition, the award prompted then Vice President of the US, Al Gore, to visit Ann Street to promote the importance of the upcoming 2000 US Census. East Side High School serves Ironbound high school students. As of 2004 most of the elementary schools were built over 100 years prior to the time. In the 2000s, an increase in housing lead to an overcrowding of Ironbound-area schools. At the time the school district planned to replace several of the elementary schools and build a new East Side High School in the former Ballantine brewery site.

Private schools
The Roman Catholic Archdiocese of Newark operates the Ironbound Catholic Academy, a PK-8 school in Ironbound. As of 2004 many residents of Ironbound send their children to parochial schools. Ironbound used to have three other Catholic elementary schools, including Academy of St. Benedict, a PreK-8 school, St. James, both elementary and high school, and St. Lucy Filippini Academy. In 2005 the archdiocese announced that St. Casimir, St. Benedict, and St. Lucy Filippini would merge into the Ironbound Catholic Academy on the St. Casimir site. There is also the Our Lady of Fatima Nursery, a Pre-K institution and one Portuguese Language School known at Escola Luis de Camões.

Public libraries
Newark Public Library's Van Buren Branch Library serves the Ironbound neighborhood. The library opened on September 23, 1923. A renovated and expanded branch opened on November 19, 1997.

Housing 
About 60% of the real estate market in the Ironbound is two and three family houses.  Many houses built by the Portuguese include tile details and aluminum siding. In the past ten to fifteen years, more luxury condos and apartments have been built in the area. Several old factory buildings have been converted into lofts or apartments including Textile Lofts, Button Factory Lofts,  Murphy Varnish Factory, and the Chocolate Factory.

Ironbound has three housing projects within its boundaries: Hyatt Court, Pennington Court, and Terrell Homes (formerly Franklin Delano Roosevelt Homes). Tenants and activists have recently been in a battle with the Newark Housing Authority to save Terrell Homes, which the Authority had planned to demolish.

Environmental justice 
The Ironbound has a "national reputation" for being a leader in environmental justice led by a local community organizing and advocacy organization called the Ironbound Community Corporation (ICC) and an offshoot group the Ironbound Committee Against Toxic Waste (ICATW). ICC and ICATW have worked over the years with other local and national groups and figures such as Greenpeace, Lois Gibbs, and the Newark Coalition for Neighborhoods. Over the years they have worked on a number of environmental justice issues including airplane noise, dioxin, pollution and fumes.

In 1983, dangerous levels of dioxin were discovered at an abandoned chemical factory in the Ironbound. The Diamond Alkali Company was largely responsible for this pollution through their heavy production of Agent Orange between 1951 and 1969. The off-site cleanup was completed by 1986, and in 1989 the site received a permanent impermeable cap.

In the 1980s residents protested against a garbage incinerator in the neighborhood.  The incinerator was built in 1990 but residents have continued to protest environmental issues over the years. Bright pink and purple fumes were often seen spewing from the facility but Covanta, the company operating the incinerator, blamed a local hospital for improperly disposed medical waste. In summer 2019, ICC partnered with Earthjustice, a nonprofit public interest organization that litigates to protect the environment, and the Environmental Advocacy Clinic at Vermont Law School urged state officials to investigate. Covanta has been found many hundreds of times to exceed air pollution limits or to fail to abide by required safety regulations. Covanta eventually acknowledged that the fumes were produced by its burning of pesticides improperly disposed and agreed to new waste management procedures.

Notable residents 
 Playwright Richard Wesley grew up near Terrell Homes in the Ironbound and graduated from East Side High School (Newark, New Jersey)
 1922 Olympic Gold medalist Camille Sabie lived on Jefferson Street in the Ironbound
 Statesman and Supreme Court justice Charles Evans Hughes lived on Elm Street as a child
 Politician Peter Angelo Cavicchia lived on Jefferson Street
 Film inventor Hannibal Goodwin lived for a time on Ferry St
 James Moody (saxophonist) graduated East Side High School (Newark, New Jersey)
 Saxophonist, innovative jazz composer, bandleader Wayne Shorter grew up in the Ironbound.
 Randy Foye, former NBA player graduated East Side High School (Newark, New Jersey).

Popular culture 
 The early scenes of Alfred Hitchcock's 1943 thriller Shadow of a Doubt were shot in several places in Newark, including the Ironbound.
 The third track on Suzanne Vega's 1987 album Solitude Standing, "Ironbound/Fancy Poultry", has lyrics describing a scene set in the neighborhood.
 New Jersey metal band Overkill released their 15th album titled Ironbound in 2010.  Much of the album's lyrical theme, especially the title track, is built around the topic of the area and its people.
Scenes from the 2005 Steven Spielberg film War of the Worlds were filmed in the Ironbound

See also

Newark Ironbound Express
Newark Riverfront Park

Notes

References

Further reading
 
 "Portugal in Newark" - The Star-Ledger and The Newark Museum (also at Archive.is)

External links

 Ironbound Community Corporation

Brazilian communities
Brazilian-American culture in New Jersey
Cape Verdean American history
Neighborhoods in Newark, New Jersey
Portuguese-American culture in New Jersey
Ironbound
Tourist attractions in Essex County, New Jersey
Brazilian-American culture
Ethnic enclaves in New Jersey
Populated places in Essex County, New Jersey